Wes Goldie (born May 5, 1979) is a Canadian former professional ice hockey right winger who last played for the Alaska Aces of the ECHL. He is the ECHL's all-time leader in career goals with 370, and the seventh all-time career scorer with 605 points.

Career 
Goldie scored an ECHL-best 175 goals while not missing a single game over four seasons with the Victoria Salmon Kings, including 44 his final year, second only to Ryan Kinasewich. He also finished second in the league with 48 goals (a North American career-high) in 2009, when he earned first team all-ECHL honors, and 41 in 2007, while leading the ECHL with 42 in 2008. Goldie shared the league lead in shorthanded goals for three consecutive years beginning in 2007, scoring 19 over that span.

Goldie began his pro career under former Aces head coach Davis Payne with the Pee Dee Pride. Goldie played the 2003–04 season with the Pride under another former Alaska head coach, Perry Florio, and finishing tied for fourth in the league with 36 goals. In his lone recall to the AHL with Bridgeport in 2004, Goldie scored one goal in two games.

Prior to turning pro at the tail end of the 1999-2000 season, Goldie played four years in the Ontario Hockey League, scoring 121 over his last three campaigns, including a junior-best 46 in 1998–99. He missed the playoffs only once in his eight full seasons as a professional (2003–04), and owns 56 points (34 goals, 22 assists) in 61 career postseason games.

On March 24, 2012, in a loss against the Ontario Reign, Goldie broke the previous league all-time mark of 368 goals held by Rod Taylor. He retired as the league's all-time goal leader with 370.

In 2014, Goldie was inducted into the ECHL Hall of Fame.

Career statistics

References

External links 

1979 births
Living people
Alaska Aces (ECHL) players
Bridgeport Sound Tigers players
Canadian ice hockey right wingers
Florence Pride players
Ice hockey people from Ontario
London Knights players
Owen Sound Platers players
Pee Dee Pride players
Sportspeople from London, Ontario
Victoria Salmon Kings players